USS Black Hawk (AD-9) was a destroyer tender.

Construction and commissioning

Service history

Post World War I operations
Assigned as tender and flagship to the Mine Force, Black Hawk departed Boston in June 1918 to take station at Inverness, Scotland. She remained there until the end of World War I and then shifted her base to Kirkwall, Orkney Islands, for the North Sea mine sweep. 

She returned to New York in November 1919 and served as flagship and tender for the Atlantic Fleet destroyers in reserve at Philadelphia. After the installation of a torpedo workshop and other equipment she was designated a destroyer tender (AD-9) in November 1920 and reported as flagship of the Operative Squadron, Destroyer Flotillas, Atlantic Fleet. She served mainly in Caribbean and Panamanian waters until June 1922 when she left Newport, Rhode Island, via the Suez Canal, for the Asiatic Fleet. Black Hawk remained in the Far East for twenty years during which she tended Destroyer Squadrons 5 (1922–40) and 29 (1940–42).

World War II
On 7 December 1941 Black Hawk was at Balikpapan, Borneo. She operated as a tender and repair ship at Java until 31 December 1941; at Darwin, Australia (January-3 February 1942); Java (3–20 February); and in Australian waters (26 February-29 May). Leaving Australia she steamed to Pearl Harbor, arriving 15 June 1942. She was assigned tender duty in Alaskan waters and arrived at Kodiak on 29 July 1942. Remaining there until 4 November 1942 she then returned to San Francisco, California, for repairs and overhaul.

Completing her overhaul 16 March 1943, Black Hawk returned to Alaskan waters, arriving 10 April 1943. Except for a short stay at Pearl Harbor (30 September 1943 – 1 February 1944), she remained at Adak until 21 March 1945. Following repairs at Alameda, California, she arrived at Pearl Harbor 30 May 1945; remained there until 11 September; and then proceeded to Okinawa. Black Hawk served in the Far East tending vessels at Okinawa and in China (specifically at Tsingtao) until 20 May 1946 when she headed home for the last time.

Decommissioned on 15 August 1946, she was transferred to Maritime Commission on 4 September 1947.

Awards
Victory Medal with "MOBILE BASE" clasp
American Defense Service Medal with "FLEET" clasp
American Campaign Medal
Asiatic-Pacific Campaign Medal with one battle star 
World War II Victory Medal
Navy Occupation Medal with "ASIA" clasp
China Service Medal

References

External links 

 NavSource Online: USS Black Hawk (AD-9)

1913 ships
World War I mine warfare vessels of the United States
World War II auxiliary ships of the United States
Destroyer tenders of the United States Navy
Tenders of the United States Navy
Destroyer tenders of the United States
Ships built by William Cramp & Sons
Ships of the Aleutian Islands campaign